Wu Jieming (born June 1958) is a lieutenant general in the People's Liberation Army of China who was political commissar of the PLA National Defence University from 2017 to 2021.

He was a member of the 18th Central Commission for Discipline Inspection. He was a representative of the 19th National Congress of the Chinese Communist Party and an alternate member of the 19th Central Committee of the Chinese Communist Party. He is a delegate to the 13th National People's Congress.

Biography
Wu was born in Huangchuan County, Henan, in June 1958. After high school in 1975, he became a sent-down youth during the late Cultural Revolution. He enlisted in the People's Liberation Army (PLA) in December 1976, and joined the Chinese Communist Party (CCP) in August 1978. He graduated from the Second Artillery Force Academy in 1982 and later the PLA National Defence University with a bachelor's degree in 1994. After university, he taught there.

He was recalled to the PLA National Defence University in January 2002, where he successively served as associate professor, professor, deputy director, and director. In December 2013, he became deputy political commissar of the university, rising to political commissar in June 2017. He also served as secretary of its Commission for Discipline Inspection from August 2016 to July 2017.

References

1958 births
Living people
People from Huangchuan County
PLA National Defence University alumni
People's Liberation Army generals from Henan
People's Republic of China politicians from Henan
Chinese Communist Party politicians from Henan
Alternate members of the 19th Central Committee of the Chinese Communist Party
Delegates to the 13th National People's Congress